Aubrey Baring (1912-1985) was a British film producer. For a number of years he was in
partnership with Maxwell Setton. They made movies for a newly organised Mayflower Productions, releasing through Rank.

Select filmography
Snowbound (1948) 
The Bad Lord Byron (1949)
Fools Rush In (1949)
The Spider and the Fly (1949)
Cairo Road (1950)
The Adventurers (1951)
So Little Time (1952)
Appointment in London (1953)
South of Algiers (1953)
They Who Dare (1954)
Charley Moon (1956)
The Abominable Snowman (1957) 
The Key (1958) (associate producer) 
Cone of Silence (1960)
The Wrong Arm of the Law (1963)

References

External links

Aubrey Baring at BFI

1912 births
1985 deaths
British film producers
20th-century British businesspeople